The Torneo de Promoción y Reserva is a youth football league in Peru for the Peruvian football teams in the Liga 1. The league made its debut in 2010.

The league covers has certain rules involving under age players and benefits for the senior teams. Each team must have at least three players that are at the most 19 years old. The rest of the team can be made up of players that are at the most 21 years old; however, each team has the option to have up to three players that are over the age of 21. The winning reserve team awards their senior club 2 points while the runners-up awards its senior team 1 point.

Champions

U-21 Torneo de Promoción y Reserva

U-18 Torneo de Pre-Reserva

Half-year tournaments

National Cups

Titles by club

Titles by region

Topscorers

See also
2021 U-18 Copa Generación

References

External links
 Así se jugará el campeonato peruano
 Blog del Torneo de Promoción y Reservas

 
Football leagues in Peru
Peruvian Primera División
Peru